Sant Climent de Llobregat is a municipality in the comarca of Baix Llobregat, Barcelona Province, Catalonia, Spain. It is connected by road with Viladecans and Sant Boi de Llobregat.

References

 Panareda Clopés, Josep Maria; Rios Calvet, Jaume; Rabella Vives, Josep Maria (1989). Guia de Catalunya, Barcelona: Caixa de Catalunya.  (Spanish).  (Catalan).

External links

 Sant Climent de Llobregat Town Hall webpage
 Government data pages 
 Patrimoni històric i artístic de Sant Climent de Llobregat 

Municipalities in Baix Llobregat